Dr. Georgiy Ginovker (Russian: Георгий Гиновкер) was born in St. Petersburg, Russia. He was principal cellist of Saint Petersburg Philharmonic Orchestra for many years. His primary teachers include Mstislav Rostropovich and Aleksander Schtrimer. A winner of several international competitions,  Ginovker has appeared as a soloist in Russia, Europe, Japan, and the United States. He was Professor of Cello/Chamber Music at Saint Petersburg Conservatory and Rimsky-Korsakov College. Since 1992, Mr Ginovker resides in New York. Ginovker teaches cello and chamber music in New York.  He is acting principal cellist of several orchestras in the New York Metro Area. He has recorded for international labels such as Melodiya and Bomba-Piter.

References

Living people
Russian cellists
Academic staff of Saint Petersburg Conservatory
Year of birth missing (living people)